Vilnius College or VIKO is a Lithuanian state institution of higher education, established on 1 September 2000 upon reorganizing three higher schools in Vilnius: Schools of Electronics, Economics and Commerce. It is the largest university of applied sciences in Lithuania, hosting 6,793 students and ~460 teaching staff (according to a October 2015 data). Vilnius College is the best rated college in Lithuania.

Faculties
 Faculty of Electronics and Informatics
 Faculty of Economics
 Faculty of Business Management
 Faculty of Health Care
 Faculty of Agrotechnologies
 Faculty of Pedagogics
 Faculty of Arts and Creative Technologies

References

External links

 Official website of Vilnius College

2000 establishments in Lithuania
Educational institutions established in 2000
Colleges in Lithuania
Universities and colleges in Vilnius